Lizard Lake is a lake on Vancouver Island, in British Columbia, Canada near the town of Port Renfrew. It is located in the Capital Regional District (not to be confused with Lizard Lake (Vancouver Island), a lake located to the north near the city of Port Alberni). The lake is northeast of the junction of Harris Creek and the San Juan River.

Lizard Lake is located along the Pacific Marine Circle Route to the east of Fairy Lake, and is a popular recreation site for swimming, canoeing and camping.

References 

Lakes of Vancouver Island
Lakes of British Columbia
Renfrew Land District